Salmon Falls may refer to:
 Salmon Falls (Snake River), the series of falls comprising the Upper Salmon Falls and Lower Salmon Falls on the Snake River, near Hagerman, Idaho.
Salmon Falls River, in Maine and New Hampshire.
Salmon Falls Village, now Rollinsford, New Hampshire, Somersworth, New Hampshire and Berwick, Maine
Salmon Falls, California, a former settlement in that state.
Salmon River Falls, a waterfall on New York's Salmon River.